Nationality words link to articles with information on the nation's poetry or literature (for instance, Irish or France).

Events

Works published

Great Britain
 Thomas Hobbes, translator, Homer's Iliads in English: To which may be added Homer's Odysses (Hobbes's translation of the Odyssey was published in 1675)
 Benjamin Tompson, New Englands Crisis. Or a Brief Narrative, of New-Englands Lamentable Estate at Present [...], reprinted for the most part in New-England's Tears for Her Present Miseries, also published this year; English Colonial America
 John Wilmot, Earl of Rochester:
 A New Collection of the Choicest Songs, including "While on those lovely looks I gaze," by John Wilmot, London
 year uncertain – Corydon and Cloris or, The Wanton Sheepherdess, a broadside, London

Other
 Isaac de Benserade, Métamorphoses d'Ovide, written in rondeaux form; received such a bad critical reception that it hurt the author's reputation, although he remained popular; France
 Peter Folger, A Looking-Glass for the Times, English Colonial America

Births
Death years link to the corresponding "[year] in poetry" article:
 July 14 – Caspar Abel (died 1763), German theologian, historian and poet
 December 30 – John Philips (died 1709), English

Deaths
Birth years link to the corresponding "[year] in poetry" article:
 May 27 – Paul Gerhardt (born 1607), German hymn writer
 June 25 – François Hédelin (born 1604), French abbé of Aubignac and Meymac, poet, playwright, scholar and drama theorist
 September 4 – John Ogilby (born 1600), Scottish translator, impresario and cartographer
 October 26 – Jean Desmarets (born 1595), French poet and playwright
 December 18 – Edward Benlowes (born 1603), English

See also

 Poetry
 17th century in poetry
 17th century in literature
 Restoration literature

Notes

17th-century poetry
Poetry